Wąsosze may refer to the following places:
Wąsosze, Greater Poland Voivodeship (west-central Poland)
Wąsosze, Mława County in Masovian Voivodeship (east-central Poland)
Wąsosze, Węgrów County in Masovian Voivodeship (east-central Poland)
Wąsosze (lake), lake in West Pomeranian Voivodeship (northwestern Poland)